Lenine may refer to:
Lenine (musician), Brazilian singer-songwriter
Lenine, Crimea, an urban-type settlement on the Crimean Peninsula
Lenine Raion, a district of Crimea
Lenine, an alternative transliteration of Lenin, leader of the October Revolution and the founder of the Soviet Union

See also
Lenin (disambiguation)
Leonine (disambiguation)
Musée Lenine, a museum devoted to Vladimir Lenin, in Paris, France